Aleksandra Igorevna Zueva (Russian: Александра Игоревна Зуева; born 5 July 1994) is a Russian competitor in synchronized swimming.

She won 2 gold medals at the 2013 World Aquatics Championships, a gold medal at the 2013 Summer Universiade, and 2 gold medals at the 2010 European Aquatics Championships.

References
 FINA profile

Living people
Russian synchronized swimmers
1994 births
World Aquatics Championships medalists in synchronised swimming
Synchronized swimmers at the 2013 World Aquatics Championships
Universiade medalists in synchronized swimming
Universiade gold medalists for Russia
European Aquatics Championships medalists in synchronised swimming
Medalists at the 2013 Summer Universiade